Phenotype is the fifth and final studio album by Dutch metal band Textures. It was released on February 5, 2016, by Nuclear Blast.

The album was recorded at the same time as another album, Genotype, which was set to be released in 2017. Both albums were based around the same concept, and thus could be considered parts of a double album. Due to the band's split-up, Genotype was not released.

This is the only album to feature new lead guitarist Joe Tal, who replaced founding member Jochem Jacobs (who continued in his role as producer).

Track listing

Personnel
Textures
 Daniël de Jongh – vocals
 Joe Tal – lead guitar
 Bart Hannephof – rhythm guitar, backing vocals
 Remko Tielemans – bass guitar, backing vocals
 Stef Broks – drums
 Uri Dijk – keyboards, programming, backing vocals

Production
Jochem Jacobs - recording, mixing, mastering
Yuma van Eekelen - recording

References 

Textures (band) albums
2016 albums
Nuclear Blast albums